The 2005 Trophée des Champions was a football match held at Stade de l'Abbé-Deschamps, Auxerre on 27 July 2005, that saw 2004–05 Ligue 1 champions Olympique Lyonnais defeat 2005 Coupe de France winners AJ Auxerre 4–1.

Match details

See also
2005–06 Ligue 1
2005–06 Coupe de France

2005–06 in French football
2005
AJ Auxerre matches
Olympique Lyonnais matches
July 2005 sports events in France
Sport in Yonne